Tôn Nữ Thị Ninh (born on October 30, 1947) is a Vietnamese diplomat and educator. 
She served as the Vietnamese Ambassador to EU and other European nations such as Belgium, Netherland. She also served as the Deputy Chair of the Foreign Affairs Committee in the Vietnamese National Assembly. In 1997, Ton Nu was awarded the second rank Legion of Honour after the Hanoi French Summit. In 2013, she received the third rank Legion of Honors.

Early life, education and career 
Tôn Nữ Thị Ninh was born on October 30, 1947 in Hue City, Thua Thien-Hue province, Vietnam. Because she was a descendant of the royal Nguyen dynasty, her surname is "Tôn Nữ" (it is same as a male descendant of Nguyen dynasty who is named "Tôn Thất"). In 1950, her family moved to France and then came back to Saigon, where she attended the Marie Curie high school. In 1964, she attended the Université de Paris and later the University of Cambridge.

She joined Viet Cong, which later became the Provisional Revolutionary Government of the Republic of South Vietnam as an assistant and a translator of the Vietnam delegates negotiating at the Paris Peace Accords from 1968 to 1973, especially in the unofficial negotiations of Ambassador Nguyen Thi Binh. She used to be a university lecturer at Université Sorbonne-Nouvelle .

Diplomatic career 
After coming back to Vietnam in 1972, she became the Associate Dean of the English Faculty of the Saigon University of Education (now the Ho Chi Minh City University of Education). In 1975, when she was the Deputy Director of the English Department at the University of Education, Ton Nu met the Chair of the Central Foreign Affairs Committee of the Vietnam Communist Party, and accepted his invitation to work at the Foreign Affairs Committee. She began her career as an interpreter for  figures such as Vietnamese Prime Minister Pham Van Dong, General Vo Nguyen Giap, French President Francois Mitterrand. She was the Vice President of Vietnam Peace Committee, President of the Ho Chi Minh City Peace Committee, member of Council of Leaders for Peace, Ambassador to EU and Belgium, Deputy Chair of Foreign Affairs Committee and member of the Vietnam National Assembly.

Today, Ton Nu is the president of the Ho Chi Minh City Peace and Development Foundation. She's now focusing on the socio-cultural sphere, working to promote Vietnam's sustainable development , empowerment of women and youth, and contribute to Vietnam's more effective international integration and national branding

In her time as the Deputy Chair of Foreign Affairs Committee, she was very critical of the United States accusations on the problem of human rights in Vietnam, citing the country's sovereignty over its legal process and people: "We have some naughty and stubborn children and grandchildren in the family, so we punish them behind closed door, and of course, we punish them our ways. The neighbors shouldn't knock on our door and put their noses into our family's business".

She also showed her disapproval over the appointment of Bob Kerrey as the Fulbright University of Vietnam's chancellor. In her letter to the editors of the New York Times, she wrote: "While Mr. Kerry has expressed remorse over his role in the Thank Phong massacre, a leadership position at a university with the status and ambitions of FUV, a joint American-Vietnamese venture set to start up in the fall of 2017, should not be viewed as an opportunity to atone for past wrongdoings. That opportunity can take other, uncontroversial forms".

She was the author of the book Tu duy va chia se.

References 

1947 births
Living people
Vietnamese diplomats
Alumni of the University of Cambridge